Bembidion lunulatum is a species of ground beetle native to Europe.

References

lunulatum
Beetles described in 1785
Beetles of Europe